Dhamakapella (abbreviated Dhamaka) is a coed South Asian fusion a cappella group based in Case Western Reserve University, Cleveland, Ohio. Formed in the spring of 2005 by students Mayank Prasad, Raksha Soora, and Manoj Nair, Dhamakapella's music has been influenced from both Eastern and Western elements, and mixes contemporary Western songs with popular Eastern music. Since Dhamaka's inception in 2005, the group has recorded and produced albums, EPs, and singles composed entirely of original arrangements written by current members of the group or alumni.  As CWRU's largest competitive a cappella group, the group competes nationally and has won twenty-one national titles.

Career

Dhamakapella was formed in 2005 by student Mayank Prasad at Case Western Reserve University. With help from students Raksha Soora and Manoj Nair, Mayank organized and established the first university-recognized coed a cappella group, which would feature genres from both Western and Eastern cultures. Within three years, Dhamakapella grew into a sixteen-member group, with singers of various and diverse styles. Due to the nontraditional arrangements and unique compositions, the group instantly stood out both on campus and in downtown Cleveland.

Dhamakapella began nationally competing in the fall of 2011, becoming Case Western Reserve University's sole competitive a cappella group on campus.  By 2016, they had already won six national titles at various competitions across the country. In 2017, after winning another 3 national titles, Dhamakapella was one of seven teams to qualify for the first-ever South Asian fusion a cappella bid-style championship, All-American Awaaz (A3), where they placed 3rd and won "Best Arrangement" for their arrangement of "Man Mandira". In 2018, Dhamakapella qualified again for A3 after holding the top spot in the bid point rankings for the entire season. They placed 2nd and received two individual awards. In 2019, in addition to qualifying yet again for A3, Dhamakapella entered the International Competition of Collegiate A Cappella (ICCA) circuit in their local Midwest region for the first time. They were accepted into Quarterfinals where they placed 2nd and qualified for the Midwest Semifinal in St Louis, Missouri.

In 2011, Dhamakapella released its debut album Pehli Nazar: First Look, and in 2015 released its sophomore album Naya Zamana / Welcome to the New Age, following the group's growing popularity across the city and the University. In late 2014, the group released their first music video ever, for their arrangement "Radioactive / Jiya Jale / Ae Ajinabi" from Naya Zamana. In December 2016, Dhamakapella released a single, "Don't You Worry Child / Dastaan-E-Om Shanti Om" and later released their second music video for the same song. On August 23, 2017, Dhamakapella released their first EP, Riyaaz. As revealed on their Facebook page, Riyaaz consists of all three songs from their 2016-2017 award-winning competition set. On November 17, 2018, Dhamakapella released their second competition set EP entitled Afsana: Our Story. It consists of the four songs from their 2017-2018 competition set.

Competitions and Awards
Dhamakapella performs across the United States and at various universities, spanning cities from Boston to Los Angeles. Since beginning to compete in 2011, Dhamakapella has placed at twenty-two national a cappella competitions, winning additional accolades along the way:

 2nd at Anahat 2011, at the University of California, Berkeley
 2nd at Phillyfest Phillharmonic 2013 in Philadelphia,
 1st at Gathe Raho 2013 at the University of Iowa
 Best Choreography
 Best Female Soloist (Neha Dwivedi)
 Best Beatboxer (Rahul Chander)
 2nd at Sangeet Saagar 2015 at North Carolina State University
 1st at Gathe Raho 2015 at the University of Iowa
 Best Female Soloist (Neha Dwivedi, Krithika Rajkumar) 
1st at Sangeet Saagar 2016 at North Carolina State University
 2nd at Sangeet Saagar 2017 at the University of North Carolina at Chapel Hill
 1st at Yaadein 2017 at Boston University
 Best Soloist (Madhav Nandan, Naveen Ram)
 Best Arrangement ("Man Mandira" arr. by Shaunak Roy)
 2nd at Gathe Raho 2017 at the University of Iowa
 Best Male Soloist (Vasu Kuram, Naveen Ram, Shaunak Roy)
 Best Arrangement ("Writing's On The Wall / Duaa" arr. by Shaunak Roy)
 3rd at All-American Awaaz 2017 in New York City
 "Crowd Favorite" Award
 Best Arrangement ("Man Mandira" arr. by Shaunak Roy)
 1st at Jeena 2017 at the University of Texas at Austin
 Best Arrangement (Shaunak Roy)
 Best Male Soloist (Madhav Nandan)
 1st at Yaadein 2018 at Boston University
 Best Arrangement (Entire Set arr. by Ronnell Canada and Shaunak Roy)
 Best Vocal Percussionist (Shaunak Roy)
 2nd at All-American Awaaz 2018 in Chicago, IL
 Outstanding Male Soloist (Vasu Kuram)
 Outstanding Visual Performance
Sahana 2019 at the University of California, Los Angeles
Outstanding Arrangement ("Fool For You / Soch Na Sake / Judaai" arr. by Shaunak Roy)
2nd at ICCA Midwest Quarterfinal #4 2019 at Granville High School in Granville, OH
Outstanding Vocal Percussion (Lewis Orr)
3rd at Gathe Raho 2019 at the University of Iowa
All-American Awaaz 2019 in Washington, D.C.
Outstanding South Asian Soloist (Divyam Agrawal)
3rd at ICCA Midwest Quarterfinal #1 2020 at Case Western Reserve University
1st at Steel City Sapna 2022 at the University of Pittsburgh
Best Vocal Percussion (Vivek Kapur)
Best Arrangement ("Bhare Naina / Light 'em Up" arr. by Anusha Mudigonda)
1st at ICCA Midwest Quarterfinal #1 2022 at Case Western Reserve University
Outstanding Arrangement ("Bhare Naina / Light 'em Up" arr. by Anusha Mudigonda)
Outstanding Choreography (Kasey Pukys and Jennifer Huang)
2nd at ICCA Midwest Semifinal 2022 at Washington University in St. Louis
Outstanding Vocal Percussion (Vivek Kapur)
2nd at Gathe Raho 2022 (Virtual) at the University of Iowa
Outstanding Non-South Asian Soloist (Anusha Mudigonda)
Best Visual Performance (Kasey Pukys and Jennifer Huang)
1st at All-American Awaaz 2022 in San Antonio, TX
1st at Steel City Sapna 2023 at the University of Pittsburgh
Outstanding Arrangement ("Ae Dil Hai Mushkil / All For Us" arr. by Juniper Duncan)
1st at Gathe Raho 2023 at the University of Iowa
Outstanding Vocal Percussion (Sashvat Iyer)
Outstanding Visual Performance (Jennifer Huang)
Outstanding Arrangement ("Ae Dil Hai Mushkil / All For Us" arr. by Juniper Duncan)
Outstanding Solo in a Non-South Asian Song (Harshini Somisetty for "Youth")
2nd at ICCA Midwest Quarterfinal #4 2023
Outstanding Vocal Percussion (Sashvat Iyer)
Other competitions that Dhamakapella has partaken in include SingStrong A Cappella Festival 2012, and Wooster VoiceFest 2013.

Artistry 
All of Dhamakapella's arrangements, performed and recorded, have been written by members or alumni of the group. The arrangements aim to be cohesive and create a new story arc based upon the songs that are fused together. As a South Asian fusion group, the group derives its influences from Indian classical, contemporary Bollywood, pop, dubstep, and electronic genres.

Discography
 Pehli Nazar: First Look (2011)
 Naya Zamana / Welcome to the New Age (2015)
 Riyaaz (2017)
Afsana: Our Story (2018)
Fitoor (2020)
Ishaara (2022)

Reception
Pehli Nazar: First Look was released on April 14, 2011 and received mixed to positive reviews from music critics. The Recorded A Cappella Review Board, which assigns a normalized rating out of 5, gave the album a 3, based on various reviews. Jonathan Minkoff quoted that “The unique vocal flips, melismas and haunting scale forms of Indian music are by far the most interesting elements of the group's debut” and “The merger of East and West is a compelling artistic concept and one that Dhamakapella is uniquely suited to present.” Writer Catherine Lewis praised the album's arrangements and complexity, stating “When Dhamakapella is on, the group absolutely hits it out of the park.”

Naya Zamana / Welcome to the New Age was released on February 28, 2015 and received mostly positive reviews. The Recorded A Cappella Review Board gave the album a 3.7, based on various reviews. Critic Dave Bernstein praised the album's sound and production, quoting that "Dhamakapella has taken bold steps forward in its own evolution with Naya Zamana / Welcome to the New Age". Writer Leigh Holmes Foster states that the album "Ushers in a new age for the group", and compliments the group's soloists and energy.

Riyaaz was released on August 23, 2017 and received mostly positive reviews. The Recorded A Cappella Review Board gave the EP a 3.7, based on various reviews. Kimberly Raschka Sailor complimented the EP's arrangements, stating, "Riyaaz is unique and engaging, offering stronger arrangements than RARB typically receives in the South Asian a cappella realm." Stephen Lanza critiqued the group's energy and intensity, writing, "I very much like many of the decisions that Shaunak Roy makes in the colors of the backgrounds, but finding ways to keep the energy and the emotion moving forward as the songs advance is still a bit of a lacking area in this album." Thomas Dec wrote, "Riyaaz is not a show stopper, but it is in line with the average RARB submission and worth a listen."

References

External links
 Dhamakapella's Official Website
 Case Western Reserve University
Listen to Dhamakapella on YouTube
 Dhamakapella's First Place Performance at Gathe Raho 2013
 Dhamakapella's First Place Performance at Gathe Raho 2015
 Dhamakapella's First Place Performance at Sangeet Saagar 2016

Case Western Reserve University
Collegiate a cappella groups
American musicians of Indian descent